Cristian Lucca (born 17 December 1990) is a Brazilian footballer who currently plays as a defender for ASA.

Career statistics

Club

Notes

References

1990 births
Living people
Brazilian footballers
Brazilian expatriate footballers
Association football defenders
Associação Esportiva e Recreativa Santo Ângelo players
Sport Club Internacional players
Bassano Virtus 55 S.T. players
Esporte Clube São José players
Esporte Clube Juventude players
Clube Esportivo Aimoré players
FC Cascavel players
Esporte Clube Internacional de Lages players
Clube Náutico Marcílio Dias players
Al Tadhamon SC players
Sinop Futebol Clube players
Akhaa Ahli Aley FC players
America Football Club (Rio de Janeiro) players
Serie C players
Campeonato Brasileiro Série D players
Kuwait Premier League players
Lebanese Premier League players
Brazilian expatriate sportspeople in Kuwait
Expatriate footballers in Kuwait
Brazilian expatriate sportspeople in Lebanon
Expatriate footballers in Lebanon